Zodarion styliferum is a spider species found in Portugal, Spain and Madeira.

It is parasitized by a parasitoid wasp.

See also 
 List of Zodariidae species

References

External links 

styliferum
Spiders of Europe
Arthropods of Madeira
Spiders described in 1870